The Rock is an unincorporated community in Upson County, Georgia, United States. The Rock has a post office with ZIP code 30285, although the post office is on the list to be closed. The Rock is also home to the area-famous Rock Ranch, a small theme park with a farming theme.
The Rock is bordered by the cities of Barnesville, Hannahs Mill, Meansville, and Yatesville.

History
A post office called The Rock was established in 1853. The community was named for a rock formation near the original town site.

The Georgia General Assembly incorporated The Rock as a town in 1877. The town's municipal charter was repealed in 1995.

In 1847, the Central of Georgia Railway opened its Thomaston to Barnesville line, which ran through The Rock. In 1963, the Southern Railway (U.S.) acquired the Central of Georgia, and with it, the line in The Rock. When the Southern merged with the N&W to form the Norfolk Southern Railway in 1982, the line in The Rock, as well as all former CofG trackage, went to NS. In 2016, NS leased the line to its current operator, CaterParrot Railnet.

References

Unincorporated communities in Upson County, Georgia
Unincorporated communities in Georgia (U.S. state)
Populated places disestablished in 1995
Former municipalities in Georgia (U.S. state)